The longnose poacher (Sarritor leptorhynchus) is a fish in the family Agonidae. It was described by Charles Henry Gilbert in 1896, originally under the genus Odontopyxis. It is a marine, deep water-dwelling fish which is known from the northern Pacific Ocean, including the Bering Sea, southeastern Alaska, northern Japan, the Sea of Japan and the Sea of Okhotsk.

The Longfin poacher's diet consists of crustaceans such as euphausiids, mysids, amphipods, and copepods, as well as polychaetes and other benthic invertebrates.

References

Longnose poacher
Taxa named by Charles Henry Gilbert
Fish described in 1896